Agios Dionyssios may refer to:

Agios Dionyssios, Patras, Greece
, a ship

See also
Saint Dionysius (disambiguation)
San Dionisio (disambiguation)